Seol Jae-min (born 15 January 1990) is a South Korean tennis player who was born in Gyeonggi Province, South Korea.

Seol has a career high ATP singles ranking of 950 achieved on 24 August 2015 and a career high ATP doubles ranking of 584, achieved on 21 November 2016. Seol has won six ITF doubles titles.

Seol has represented South Korea at the Davis Cup, where he has a win–loss record of 2–4. Seol has also represented South Korea in the Summer Universiade and won a gold medal in the Men's Team and a bronze medal in the Men's Doubles at the 2011 Summer Universiade in Shenzhen.

External links

1990 births
Living people
South Korean male tennis players
Sportspeople from Gyeonggi Province
Universiade medalists in tennis
Tennis players at the 2010 Asian Games
Universiade gold medalists for South Korea
Universiade bronze medalists for South Korea
Asian Games competitors for South Korea
Medalists at the 2011 Summer Universiade
21st-century South Korean people